Kevin Shea (born 16 April 1964) is a former South African horse racing jockey. He was a former stable jockey for trainer Mike de Kock, and rode 26 Grade 1 winners for the trainer.

His career lasted 37 years, before retiring in 2015 after experiencing chronic back problems. He is currently an on-course presenter for Gold Circle TV which covers horse racing in KwaZulu-Natal.

Early life

Shea attended Northlands High School, before enrolling into the South African Jockey Academy in 1977.

Early career

Shea's first winner as an apprentice came in 1979, onboard DRUID'S ROBE for trainer Des Rich. He would go onto ride 100 winners as an apprentice.

Major wins

South Africa

He is a two-time winner of the Vodacom Durban July. His first victory coming on board the filly Ipi Tombe for trainer Mike de Kock in 2002. His second July victory came in 2008 when he dead-heated for first with Dancers Daughter for the Justin Snaith stable.

Shea won the Summer Cup four times. His first win came in 1982 while still an apprentice, on board the filly 'Have A Fling' for trainer Buller Benton (the race then was known as the Holiday Inns).

International

Shea has ridden winners in UAE (Dubai), Hong Kong, Mauritius and Singapore. His list of international feature wins include the Dubai Duty Free (Ipi Tombe, 2003), Sheema Classic (Sun Classique, 2008), QEII Cup (Archipenko, 2008), Hong Kong Cup (2008), Singapore Cup (2010) and Jebel Hatta (2012).

South African Colours

Shea represented South Africa in the International Jockeys’ Challenge in November 2008, which took place at Turffontein.

Feature Winners

Here is a list of Grade 1 wins by Kevin Shea.

References

South African jockeys
Living people
1963 births